was a Japanese sumo wrestler from Noto Province. He was the sport's 6th yokozuna. He trained ōzeki Tsurugizan Taniemon.

Early career
He was born in Shitsumi, Noto. His birth name remains ambiguous, but was claimed to be . He was born to poor farmers and worked as a stable boy in the countryside. He made his debut under the shikona  in March 1815 and won the jonokuchi tournament.

Makuuchi career
He reached the top makuuchi division in October 1822 and transferred to the Shikoroyama stable. He began to wrestle for the Chōshū Domain under the ring name . In January 1824, he was defeated by Inazuma, but defeated others at the maegashira #2 rank and was promoted to komusubi. In the summer of 1825, he defeated Inazuma at the Hirakawa Tenjin Shrine. He was promoted to ōzeki in October 1826. In March 1827, he was given his definitive ring name by his lord and was renamed  to evoke a famous scenic spot in Hagi, Yamaguchi (once part of the Chōshū domain).

Yokozuna
At the time, he was the first yokozuna to be promoted in 31 years, since the promotion of Onogawa Kisaburō. On 25 March 1829, Ienari Tokugawa was present to see Ōnomatsu defeat Inazuma. Ōnomatsu retired in October 1835 after eight years as yokozuna. In the top makuuchi division, he won 142 bouts and lost 31 bouts, recording a winning percentage of 82.1. He was permitted to stay as an elder under his ring name. He died in Edo in 1851 and his remains were divided between the Gyokusen-in temple of Kōtō, Tokyo and the Ritsuzo-ji temple in Teramachi, Kanazawa. Since the funeral of Ōnomatsu in the Tokyo temple, it was cutsomary to have the wrestlers using the Ōnomatsu shikona buried in this temple (from the first to the fourth).
In 1936, a monument made of natural stone pulled up from the seabed of Ugawa Port was erected the by a resolution of his hometown Ugawa Village.

Fighting style
Ōnomatsu  was known for being extremely careful in his moves, often waiting for his opponent to start first. In practice,  he would want to shake his competitors' confidence by oftenly do matta, waiting at the initial charge (or tachi-ai) of his sumo bouts. He would also attempt to win bouts by fair means or foul.
He was often criticised for his fighting style but was a mild-mannered, righteous man, and never became egoistic, which made him very popular among Edo people. His rivalry with 7th yokozuna Inazuma boosted the popularity of sumo during the Bunsei era and Tenpō era. His overall career record was quite far behind Inazuma, but his record over Inazuma was five wins (including two other than honbasho), four losses, five draws and one hold.

Top division record
The actual time the tournaments were held during the year in this period often varied.
 
 
    
    
  
 
    
    
  

    
    
  

    
    
  

    
    
  

    
    
  

    
    
  

    
    
  

    
    
  

    
    
  

    
    
  

    
    
  

    
    
  

    
    
  

*Championships for the best record in a tournament were not recognised or awarded before the 1909 summer tournament, and the unofficial championships above are historically conferred. For more information, see yūshō.

See also

Glossary of sumo terms
List of past sumo wrestlers
List of yokozuna

References

1794 births
1852 deaths
Date of birth unknown
Japanese sumo wrestlers
Place of death missing
Sumo people from Ishikawa Prefecture
Yokozuna
19th-century wrestlers